Daniele Adani (born 10 July 1974) is an Italian former professional footballer who played as a central defender.

Club career
Adani started his career in Serie B with Modena, making his first team debuts at the age of 18. In 1994, he transferred to top level's Lazio but, after two gameless months, moved to Brescia in November; subsequently, he followed the club's promotion and relegation between the first and second divisions, appearing in nearly 200 official matches.

In 1999, Adani transferred to Fiorentina for 7 billion lire (€3.615 million), winning the Italian Cup in his second season. In 2002, the club faced bankruptcy, and the player signed for Internazionale on a free transfer. Though he was not regarded as member of the starting lineup, he would be in the starting lineup more times than expected, managing to score two goals during his two-season stint (in away wins against Empoli and Ancona); he also broke his nose while playing for the Nerazzurri and decided to play with a titanium mask, as Paolo Maldini had done previously. Adani also wore a similar non-metallic mask after he recovered, but dropped it shortly after.

In 2004, Adani returned to Brescia, but left the club in March of the following year, along with Roberto Guana. He joined Ascoli shortly after, appearing in only three games as the Marche side managed to retain its top flight status.

Before retiring from professional football at the age of 34, Adani played two years with Empoli, both in the first division, being regularly used in his first year as the club qualified to the UEFA Cup, but only in six games in his second, as the Tuscany outfit dropped down a level.

In 2009, Adani returned to football with amateurs Sammartinese, in Seconda Categoria (9th level).

International career
Adani received five caps for Italy in four years. His debut came on 15 November 2000, in a 1–0 friendly win with England.

On 27 March 2002, against the same opponent, in another exhibition match, Adani made his second appearance, in a 2–1 win at Elland Road, again as a second-half substitute.

Style of play
Regarded as a promising defender in his youth, Adani was known for his composure on the ball and versatility; although he was usually deployed as a man marking centre-back, he was capable of playing anywhere along the back line.

Coaching career
He obtained UEFA B coaching license in 2008. (third category of the license) In 2010, he got the A license, made him eligible to coach Serie C team or as a vice-coach in higher divisions. On 19 July 2011, it was announced that he would be the vice-coach of Serie B team Vicenza, under Silvio Baldini.

TV commentator
In 2010, he started working as a color commentator for Sportitalia. In 2012, he joined Sky Sport (Italy).
After joining Rai as a commentator, during 2022 World Cup quarter finals, Adani compared Lionel Messi  with Jesus, saying that the Argentinian is capable of  making wine from water.

Honours

Club
Fiorentina
Coppa Italia: 2000–01

References

External links
Daniele Adani at Inter.it 
Daniele Adani at FIGC.it  

1974 births
Living people
Sportspeople from the Province of Reggio Emilia
Italian footballers
Italian football managers
Association football defenders
Serie A players
Serie B players
Modena F.C. players
S.S. Lazio players
Brescia Calcio players
ACF Fiorentina players
Inter Milan players
Ascoli Calcio 1898 F.C. players
Empoli F.C. players
Italy international footballers
Footballers from Emilia-Romagna